National Provincial Bank v Charnley [1924] 1 KB 431 is a UK insolvency law case, concerning the taking of a security interest over a company's assets and priority of creditors in a company winding up.

Facts
Two creditors of the Fylde Bacon Curing Co were in dispute over who could seize the company’s property. The National Provincial Bank had a contract on 16 July 1921 that said it had a lease ‘demised’ for 996 years over ‘plant used in or about the premises’ in return for a loan. Charnley, an unsecured creditor who had already got judgment, argued that this did not include some company vans, because the word ‘demise’ suggested things concerning land. The bank claimed the vans should belong to it, because its charge was first, and its charge was duly registered under the Companies Act 1908, section 93 (now Companies Act 2006, s 860).

Judgment
The Court of Appeal held, Bankes LJ and Scrutton LJ giving the first two judgments, that the substance of the documents was that a charge was to be created, and the charge had been properly registered. Atkin LJ concurred and started his judgment with an outline of what a charge was. It being a matter of the parties’ intentions, a charge had been created.

See also

UK insolvency law

Notes

References

United Kingdom company case law
United Kingdom insolvency case law
Court of Appeal (England and Wales) cases
1924 in British law
1924 in case law